Adwell House, Adwell, Oxfordshire, is a Grade II* listed building and the family seat of the Birch Reynardson family.

References

External links 

Grade II* listed houses
Grade II* listed buildings in Oxfordshire
Country houses in Oxfordshire
Birch Reynardson family
South Oxfordshire District